Eastern Downs was a Legislative Assembly electorate in the colony of Queensland (later a state of Australia).

History
Eastern Downs was of the original sixteen electorates of 1859. It comprised a large area south-west of Toowoomba embracing Texas, Warwick, Dalby and all the area south to the New South Wales border. It was abolished in the 1872 redistribution, being split into the Electoral district of Darling Downs, the Electoral district of Carnarvon and the Electoral district of Balonne.

Members

The following people were elected in the seat of Eastern Downs:

See also
 Electoral districts of Queensland
 Members of the Queensland Legislative Assembly by year
 :Category:Members of the Queensland Legislative Assembly by name

References

Former electoral districts of Queensland
Constituencies established in 1860
Constituencies disestablished in 1873
1860 establishments in Australia
1873 disestablishments in Australia